Ken Friedman (born September 19, 1949 in New London, Connecticut) is a design researcher. He was a member of Fluxus, an international laboratory for experimental art, architecture, design, and music. Friedman joined Fluxus in 1966 as the youngest member of the classic Fluxus group. He has worked closely with other Fluxus artists and composers such as George Maciunas, Dick Higgins, and Nam June Paik, as well as collaborating with John Cage and Joseph Beuys. He was the general manager of Dick Higgins's Something Else Press in the early 1970s. In the 1990s, Friedman's work as a management consultant and designer led him to an academic career, first as Professor of Leadership and Strategic Design at the Norwegian School of Management in Oslo, then as Dean of the Faculty of Design at Swinburne University of Technology in Melbourne. Friedman is currently University Distinguished Professor at Swinburne and Chair Professor of Design Innovation Studies at Tongji University.

Education
From 1965 to 1966, Friedman studied at Shimer College, a Great Books school then located in Mount Carroll, Illinois. It was at this time that he developed the programs at Radio WRSB that brought him into contact with Dick Higgins and the Something Else Press.  While Friedman was at Shimer, he created the score for A Mandatory Happening. George Maciunas would produce this as one of Friedman’s first Fluxus boxes.

Friedman received his Master of Arts degree in Interdisciplinary Studies in education, psychology, and social science from San Francisco State University in 1971. He received his doctorate in 1976 from the United States International University. In 2007 Loughborough University in the UK honored Friedman with the degree of Doctor of Science, honoris causa, for outstanding contributions to design research.

Artistic career
Recent solo exhibitions of Ken Friedman’s work include Ken Friedman: 99 Events at Stendhal Galleryin New York City, Ken Friedman Art(net)worker Extraordinaire at the University of Iowa Museum of Art in 2000, and Twelve Structures at The Centre of Attention, London, in 2004.

Many museums and galleries presented Friedman's work in group exhibitions over the past decade. These include Fluxus and the Essential Questions of Life, a traveling exhibition in 2011 from The Hood Museum of Art,  and several exhibitions at the Museum of Modern Art in New York 

Friedman’s work is represented in major museums and galleries around the world, including the Museum of Modern Art and the Guggenheim Museum in New York, the Tate Modern in London, the Hood Museum of Art at Dartmouth College, and Staatsgalerie Stuttgart. The University of Iowa Alternative Traditions in the Contemporary Arts is the official repository of Friedman’s art work, personal papers, and research notes. Archiv Sohm at Staatsgalerie Stuttgart and the Mandeville Department of Special Collections at the University of California hold extensive collections of his work and papers from the 1960s and 1970s.

Academic career
In the 1970s he was Director of the Institute for Advanced Studies in Contemporary Art, San Diego, and during the mid-1980s he was President of the Art Economist Corporation in New York. From 1994 to 2009, Friedman was Professor of Leadership and Strategic Design at the Norwegian School of Management in Oslo, as well as professor the Design Research Center at The Danish Design School in Copenhagen from 2003 to 2009. In October 2007, he was appointed Dean of the Faculty of Design at Swinburne University of Technology in Melbourne, a position he held through 2012. Friedman is currently University Distinguished Professor at Swinburne and Chair Professor of Design Innovation Studies at Tongji University.

Friedman is Editor-in-Chief of She Ji: The Journal of Design, Economics, and Innovation, a research journal published by Tongji University Press and Elsevier, and he is editor of Design Thinking, Design Theory, a book series from The MIT Press that Friedman edits together with Erik Stolterman of Indiana University.

References

Further reading
Baas, Jacquelynne, ed. 2011. Fluxus and the Essential Questions of Life. Hanover, New Hampshire and Chicago: The Hood Museum of Art and University of Chicago Press.

Chung, You Jin. 2013. Fluxus and the Zen Buddhist’s Concept of Emptiness. PhD Thesis. Reading, UK: Department of History of Art, University of Reading.

Frank, Peter. 2008. “Ken Friedman: A Life in Fluxus.” Artistic Bedfellows. Histories, Theories, and Conversations in Collaborative Art Practices. Holly Crawford, ed. Lanham, Maryland: University Press of America, pp. 145–186.

Hendricks, Jon. “Ken Friedman.” Fluxus Codex. New York: Harry N. Abrams, pp. 251–258.

Lushetich, Natasha. 2014. Fluxus: The Practice of Non-Duality. Amsterdam and New York: Rodopi.

External links 
 Friedman Biography & Bibliography
 Ken Friedman Exhibition at University of Iowa Museum of Art
 Ken Friedman Exhibition at Centre of Attention
 Ken Friedman 2004 London Concert
 Ken Friedman: Forty Years of Fluxus
 Interview Ken Friedman by Ruud Janssen
 Loughborough University Honorary DSc Citation for Ken Friedman
Ken Friedman Collection MSS 128. Special Collections & Archives, UC San Diego Library.

Fluxus
1949 births
Living people
People from New London, Connecticut
Academic staff of Swinburne University of Technology
Shimer College alumni
United States International University alumni
Design researchers